{{DISPLAYTITLE:Pi2 Octantis}}

Pi2 Octantis, Latinized from π2 Octantis, is a solitary star situated in the southern circumpolar constellation Octans. It has an apparent magnitude of 5.64, allowing it to be faintly visible to the naked eye under ideal conditions.

This object is an ageing late G-type supergiant that has 7 times the mass of the Sun and 69.02 times the radius of the Sun. Despite its advanced state, Pi2 Octantis is still a young star at an age of 43 million years.

References

Octans
Octantis, Pi2
G-type supergiants
Octantis, 22
Durchmusterung objects
131246
73771
5545